Daren Machesney (born December 13, 1986) is a Canadian former professional ice hockey goaltender who last played for the Dundas Real McCoys in the Allan Cup Hockey (ACH) during the 2013–2014 season.

Playing career 
Machesney was selected by the Washington Capitals in the fifth round (143rd overall) of the 2005 NHL Entry Draft. In August 2018, he was hired as the goaltending coach for the London Knights of the Ontario Hockey League.

References

External links

1986 births
Living people
Brampton Battalion players
Canadian ice hockey goaltenders
Elmira Jackals (ECHL) players
Hershey Bears players
Ice hockey people from Ontario
Manitoba Moose players
Reading Royals players
South Carolina Stingrays players
Sportspeople from Hamilton, Ontario
Springfield Falcons players
Victoria Salmon Kings players
Braehead Clan players
Washington Capitals draft picks
Worcester Sharks players
Canadian expatriate ice hockey players in the United States
Canadian expatriate ice hockey players in Scotland